KKNI-FM is a commercial classic hits music radio station in Sterling, Alaska, broadcasting on 105.3 FM. Previous call signs were KPFN and KSWD-FM with a frequency of 105.9, but in 2007 the station relocated to 105.3 and the KSWD-FM call sign was assigned to a Los Angeles, California station.

KKNI-FM is owned by KSRM, Incorporated.

References

External links

KNI-FM
Radio stations established in 1999
1999 establishments in Alaska